Aldieres Joaquim dos Santos Neto (born 5 May 1980), known as Buiú, is a former Brazilian football player.

Club statistics

References

External links

odn.ne.jp

1980 births
Living people
Brazilian footballers
Brazilian expatriate footballers
J1 League players
Kashiwa Reysol players
Campeonato Paranaense players
Mirassol Futebol Clube players
Coritiba Foot Ball Club players
Expatriate footballers in Japan
Brazilian expatriate sportspeople in Japan
Association football midfielders
People from Monte Aprazível